Chiloglanis occidentalis is a species of upside-down catfish that is native to western Africa. This species grows to a length of  TL.

References

External links 

occidentalis
Catfish of Africa
Freshwater fish of West Africa
Fish described in 1933